Aldo Nova (born Aldo Caporuscio on November 13, 1956) is a Canadian guitarist, keyboardist, vocalist, and producer. He initially gained fame and popularity with the release of his 1982 debut album Aldo Nova which peaked to Billboard's number 8 position, and its accompanying single, "Fantasy", which peaked to number 23 on the US  Billboard Hot 100 and boosted sales for its parent album. "Fantasy" is Nova's highest-charting signature song often being recognized as a classic.

Early Life
He was born to Italian immigrant parents in Montreal, Quebec, Canada. He changed his surname to Nova when he started playing guitar and keyboards at age 15.

Career

1980s – 1990s
Signing with Portrait Records, Nova released a self-produced album Aldo Nova in 1982, that had two singles: "Fantasy" and "Foolin' Yourself". His second album Subject...Aldo Nova from 1983, had two singles: "Monkey on Your Back" and "Always Be Mine". His third album Twitch from 1985, had two singles: "Rumours of You" and "Tonite (Lift Me Up)".

Nova was displeased with the third album and the record company's insistence on making a more commercial album. After supporting the Twitch album, Nova asked to be released from his contract, which the record company would not do. Nova decided to move to Montreal and work on jingles, waiting for his contract to expire in 1991, stating he would not work on an album he did not have full creative control over. In 1990, Aldo Nova wrote the main guitar riff that would be used in the Jon Bon Jovi song, "Blaze of Glory". In 1991, to return the favor, Bon Jovi worked with Nova on his Jambco Records (Jon Bon Jovi's label) release Blood on the Bricks. It had three singles: "Blood on the Bricks", "Medicine Man", and "Someday".

In addition, Nova produced some early Celine Dion albums. He co-wrote the hit song, "A New Day Has Come" for Dion, and has been featured playing guitar, synthesizer, and percussion on her records. He also wrote her songs "Your Light" and "I Can't Fight the Feelin'", "You and I" (which was used as Hillary Clinton's campaign song and as the Air Canada theme song). He co-wrote the Blue Öyster Cult song "Take Me Away" and was a member of "The Guitar Orchestra of the State Of Imaginos" on their album Imaginos.

In 1996, he received a Grammy Award as producer for Celine Dion's Falling into You for Album of the Year. In 1997, he released the much acclaimed, mostly instrumental album, Nova's Dream, which featured a different side of his talents as a musician writer. The album is considered by his fans as one of his best alongside his eponymous debut and Subject. He co-wrote the Latin Grammy nominated song "Aqui" for the Chilean rock group La Ley on the album Uno. He also co-wrote and co-produced 4 other tracks on that album, which later that year won a Grammy for best Latin/Alternative/Rock Album.

As a songwriter, Nova's hits include Clay Aiken's "This Is The Night" (co-written with Chris Braide and Gary Burr), which in the US was a number one hit and the best-selling single of 2003. He was also the only writer to have written or co-written five songs on Dion's Taking Chances album.

2000s – present
In 2003, Nova received an International Achievement Award at the SOCAN Awards in Toronto for co-writing the Dion song "A New Day Has Come".

In 2008, he began working on a Rock Opera named The Life and Times of Eddie Gage  which underwent significant work throughout the years, and by 2015 the album was renamed  Spaceman  having gone through 12 different versions. By this time Aldo had written over 100 songs and even posting some scrapped songs to his Facebook page such as  That's What Love Can Do, The Border, and Dyin' From a Broken Heart. In the early months of 2016 Aldo finally finished the rock opera now renamed  Space  with 20 songs and said that it was " mixed, mastered, and ready to go ".

The album's release was halted and by late 2016 Aldo decided to re-record Fantasy which inspired him to re-record 5 other songs from his first album with 1 new song  I'm a Survivor. Aldo recorded this new album in 2017, and in mid 2018 released the first single Fantasy 2.0, which received mixed reviews. The album was revealed to be 2.0 and was to be released on October 19, 2018.

During interviews for the promotion of 2.0, Aldo said that the rock opera Space now had 32 songs and was to be released in 2019 after he had toured 2.0. However, he wasn't sure because he said the release of 2.0 had reignited a flame in him and that he was writing new music again extensively.

In early 2019, Aldo released the music video to "I'm a Survivor" and announced a fall tour. In an interview with Loudwire, Aldo announced that his rock opera would release in June 2020 under the name The Life and Times of Eddie Gage. He wrote 142 songs for the album from 2008 to 2016, finally settling on the 21 that would be included for a total of 1 hour and 52 minutes of music. In an interview from 2016 with Best Magazine, Aldo describes the album as “...the story of Eddie Gage, and his evolution from light, de-evolution to darkness, and climb back up to the light again.” All of the songs are his own composition and he plays all the characters, changing his voice in each song. Nova also announced a press promotion tour of the album in the US and Canada in a post on Facebook.

Discography

Studio albums
Aldo Nova (1982) No. 8 US 2× Platinum
Subject...Aldo Nova (1983) No. 56 US Gold & Canada Platinum
Twitch (1985) Canada Gold
Blood on the Bricks (1991) No. 124 US
Nova's Dream (1997)
2.0 (2018)
The Life and Times of Eddie Gage - A Rock Opera - 10-song EP - A Little Preview (EP) (2022)
2.0 Reloaded (2022)
Short Stories (EP) (2022)
Sonic Hallucinations (EP) (2022)

Compilations
A Portrait of Aldo Nova (1991)
The Best of Aldo Nova (2006)
Under the Gun...A Portrait of Aldo Nova (2007)

Singles

Songwriter/producer

Tours
 

 Fantasy Tour (1982–1983) 
 Subject Tour (1983–1984)
 Blood on the Bricks Tour (1991)
 TBD Tour (2019)

See also

Canadian rock
List of Canadian musicians
List of bands from Canada

References

External links
Interview with Aldo Nova
Second Interview with Aldo Nova
Everything2 writeup

1956 births
20th-century Canadian keyboardists
20th-century Canadian male singers
21st-century Canadian keyboardists
21st-century Canadian male singers
Canadian hard rock musicians
Canadian heavy metal guitarists
Canadian heavy metal singers
Canadian magicians
Canadian male guitarists
Canadian male singer-songwriters
Canadian people of Italian descent
Canadian record producers
Canadian rock guitarists
Canadian rock keyboardists
Canadian rock singers
Glam metal musicians
Grammy Award winners
Living people
Musicians from Montreal